Paul Badham (born 26 September 1942) is professor emeritus of theology and religious studies at the University of Wales, Trinity Saint David. Educated at Reading School, Badham studied theology, religious studies and the philosophy of religion at Oxford (starting at Jesus College in 1962) and Cambridge universities, and received his PhD from the University of Birmingham. He trained for the Anglican Ministry at Westcott House and worked as a curate in Birmingham for  five years before his appointment at Lampeter in 1973. He became a professor in 1991 and has served as head of department, head of school and dean of the Faculty of Theology. He was director of the Alister Hardy Religious Experience Research Centre from 2002 to 2010.

He is  a vice president of Modern Church, a patron of Dignity in Dying, and a fellow of the Royal Society of Medicine. He was formerly editor of Modern Believing and a senior research fellow of the Ian Ramsey Centre for Science and Religion at Oxford University.

Publications

 Making Sense of Death and Immortality (SPCK, 2013)
 A John Hick Reader (Wipf & Stock, 2011)
 Is there a Christian Case for Assisted Dying? (SPCK, 2009)
 The Contemporary Challenge of Modernist Theology (University of Wales Press, 1998)
 Facing Death (University of Chicago Press, 1996)
 Death and Immortality in the Religions of the World, with Linda Badham (Paragon House, 1987)
 Christian Beliefs about Life after Death (MacMillan, 1976)
 A Defence of the Concept of the Soul (1976)

References

1942 births
Alumni of Jesus College, Cambridge
Alumni of Jesus College, Oxford
Alumni of Westcott House, Cambridge
Academics of the University of Wales Trinity Saint David
Alumni of the University of Birmingham
Academics of the University of Wales, Lampeter
Academics of the University of Oxford
British Christian theologians
Living people
People educated at Reading School
Writers about religion and science